Motahhar, also known as Motahharabad, may refer to:
 Motahhar-e Olya
 Motahhar-e Sofla